Another Page is Christopher Cross's second studio album, recorded in 1982 and released in early 1983. It was not as commercially successful as its predecessor (it was certified Gold by the RIAA, but only after his self-titled debut album had already been certified Platinum by the time of the release of Another Page). "Think of Laura", taken from the album as Cross's third single, reached #9 on the Billboard Hot 100 in 1984. It was Cross' final single to reach the Top 10. The first single, "All Right", reached #12 on the chart a year before. As a single, "No Time For Talk" peaked at #33. "Arthur's Theme (Best That You Can Do)" appeared as a bonus track on the cassette and later CD releases of the album.

An instrumental version of "No Time for Talk" appeared in the movie American Anthem, which was composed by the song's co-author and producer of Another Page, Michael Omartian.

Track listing
All songs written by Christopher Cross, except "Deal 'Em Again", co-written by Michael Maben, and the bonus track "Arthur's Theme," co-written by Burt Bacharach, Carole Bayer Sager and Peter Allen.

"No Time for Talk" - 4:22
"Baby Says No" - 6:04
"What Am I Supposed to Believe" (Duet with Karla Bonoff) - 4:22
"Deal 'Em Again" - 3:10
"Think of Laura" - 3:22
"All Right" - 4:18
"Talking In My Sleep" - 3:34
"Nature of the Game" - 3:55
"Long World" - 3:32
"Words of Wisdom" - 5:52
"Arthur's Theme (Best That You Can Do)" - 3:52 (Cassette & CD only - bonus track)

Personnel
 Christopher Cross – vocals, guitars, guitar solo (10), arrangements
 Rob Meurer – keyboards, synthesizer programming, percussion, arrangements
 Michael Omartian – keyboards, percussion, arrangements, string arrangements and conductor
 Jay Graydon – guitar solo (4)
 Steve Lukather – guitars, guitar solo (6)
 Abraham Laboriel – bass
 Mike Porcaro – bass 
 Andy Salmon – bass 
 Steve Gadd – drums
 Jeff Porcaro – drums
 Tommy Taylor – drums
 Lenny Castro – percussion
 Paulinho da Costa – percussion
 Tom Scott – saxophone (1)
 Ernie Watts – saxophone (3)
 Assa Drori – concertmaster
 Michael McDonald – backing vocals (1, 6)
 Carl Wilson – backing vocals (2)
 Karla Bonoff – vocals (3)
 Don Henley – backing vocals (4, 8)
 J.D. Souther – backing vocals (4, 8)
 Art Garfunkel –  backing vocals (7)
• Flamingo on cover = Flossy

Production
 Producer – Michael Omartian
 Assistant Producers – Rob Meurer and Michael Ostin
 Engineer and Mixing – Chet Himes
 Additional Engineering – John Guess, Lee Herschberg, Mark Linett and Richard Mullen.
 Assistant Engineers – Stuart Gitlin and Margaret Gwynne
 Recorded at Warner Bros. Recording Studios (Hollywood, CA), The Aspen Studios (Aspen, CO) and Studio South, Austin (Austin, TX).
 Mixed at Warner Bros. Recording Studios.
 Mastered by Bobby Hata at Warner Bros. Recording Studios.
 Art Direction and Design – Christine Sauers
 Cover Illustration – Louise Scott
 Photography – Matthew Rolston
 Lettering – Mike Manoogian
 Direction for Front Line Management – Irving Azoff and Tim Neece
 Stylist – Laurie Warner
 Set Styling – Frances Moore

Charts

Weekly charts

Year-end charts

Certifications

Singles

Notes

1983 albums
Christopher Cross albums
Albums produced by Michael Omartian
Warner Records albums